Valentyn Mykolayovych Kryachko (born 27 January 1958) is a Ukrainian football coach and a former player.

Honours
 1977 FIFA World Youth Championship winner with the Soviet Union.

References

External links
 

1958 births
Living people
Soviet footballers
Ukrainian footballers
Association football defenders
FC Metalist Kharkiv players
SKA Kiev players
FC Olympik Kharkiv players
FC Salyut Belgorod players
FC Kramatorsk players
Soviet Top League players
Ukrainian Premier League players
Ukrainian expatriate footballers
Expatriate footballers in Russia
Ukrainian football managers
FC Metalist Kharkiv managers
FC Helios Kharkiv managers
WFC Zhytlobud-1 Kharkiv managers
Ukrainian Premier League managers
Sportspeople from Kharkiv Oblast